When Christmas Comes Around... is the ninth studio album by American singer Kelly Clarkson, released on October 15, 2021, through Atlantic Records. Produced by Jesse Shatkin, Jason Halbert, Joseph Trapanese and Aben Eubanks, it is her second Christmas album after Wrapped in Red (2013) and a follow-up to her eighth studio album Meaning of Life (2017). Featuring cover versions of Christmas songs, as well as original co-penned tracks and duets with Chris Stapleton, Ariana Grande and Brett Eldredge, its release was preceded by the album's lead single "Christmas Isn't Canceled (Just You)" and second single "Santa, Can't You Hear Me". It also includes previously released singles "Christmas Eve", "All I Want for Christmas Is You", and "Under the Mistletoe" as bonus tracks. When Christmas Comes Around... was nominated for Best Traditional Pop Vocal Album at the 65th Annual Grammy Awards.

Promotion for the album included a Christmas special of the same title, which premiered on NBC on December 1, 2021. The Christmas special premiered with a 0.6 rating and 4.3 million total viewers.

Background and recording

Following the release of her first Christmas album Wrapped in Red in 2013 on RCA Records, Clarkson transferred to Atlantic Records and has issued the Christmas tracks "Christmas Eve" (2017), "Under the Mistletoe" (with Brett Eldredge), and a cover of Vince Vance & the Valiants' "All I Want for Christmas Is You" (2020). In an interview on the television program Entertainment Tonight, she revealed that she was not originally intending to record another Christmas studio album due to her fondness for her first, but later decided to following the emotional stress induced by the highly publicized divorce the previous year. In recording the album, Clarkson recorded cover versions of various Christmas classics and wrote new material featuring duets with American recording artists Chris Stapleton and Ariana Grande.

Themes and inspirations
Atlantic Records has promoted When Christmas Comes Around... as an exploration of "a wide range of holiday emotions and experiences anchored by Clarkson's incomparable vocal prowess".  Clarkson has elaborated that the album will explore various themes of love, loss, hope, and optimism — emotions that people tend to experience during the holiday season. 

Drawing inspiration from her experiences during the past two years, she remarked of the album's title, her first to not have a titular track since My December (2007), as "when Christmas comes around, we are all in different places." Further adding that its selection of tracks will both evoke a somber and posit a jolly atmosphere. Characterizing it as "a different Christmas album", she portrayed When Christmas Comes Around... as feeling more like a normal studio album, but "there's Christmas sprinkled on it."

Release
When Christmas Comes Around... was released by Atlantic Records on October 15, 2021. A special edition shipped exclusively to Target retail stores would also feature a Christmas card signed by Clarkson. Its lead single "Christmas Isn't Canceled (Just You)", was released on September 23, 2021. "Glow" with Stapleton and "Santa, Can't You Hear Me" with Grande were released as promotional singles alongside the album's release.

Critical reception
In a roundup of new holiday albums, The New York Times music critic Jon Caramanica praised Clarkson's "nimble" vocals and wrote that the original tracks, some of them strikingly "uncelebratory", make the album stand out. In the year-end episode of his Times podcast Popcast, Caramanica again praised the album, calling it "very, very good", "solid" and "impressive", though "not quite Mariah-level."

Mike DeWald of Riff Magazine praised how Clarkson's original songs are "something fresh and listenable." Sal Cinquemani of Slant Magazine, who gave the album three-and-a-half out of five stars, criticized some production choices but praised Clarkson's "impressive" vocals and "melodic variations" on the classics as the "chief selling point." Marcy Donelson of AllMusic gave the album three out of five stars, called it "a vibrant, fully orchestral, high-volume set on average", and singled out "Merry Christmas (To the One I Used to Know)" and "Santa, Can't You Hear Me" as highlights among the newest tracks."

Vultures Justin Curto calls Clarkson "the queen of the holidays", saying how the album is a gift for Christmas. Curto especially appreciates the collaboration with Ariana Grande, as it sounds "as majestic as you would expect from the two singers".

Track listing

Personnel
Credits adapted from the album's liner notes

Recorded and engineered at
Brooklyn, New York (Brooklyn Bridge Music)
Burbank, California (The Eastwood Stage at Warner Bros. Studio, The Listening Station, Glenwood Place Studios)
Los Angeles, California (The Ribcage)
Nashville, Tennessee (Ocean Way, Southern Ground)
New York City (Manhattan Beach Recording)
Pasadena, California (The Vibe Room)
Studio City, California (Everland Studios)
Universal City, California 

Performance credits
Kelly Clarkson – all vocals
Jessi Collins – background vocals
Luke Edgemon – background vocals
Brett Eldredge – featured vocals
Ariana Grande – featured vocals
Nayanna Holley – background vocals
Tiffany Palmer – background vocals
Bridget Sarai – background vocals
Chris Stapleton – featured vocals
Brandon Winbush – background vocals

Musicians

Isabel Bartles – violin
Kevin Bate – cello
Hari Bernstein – viola
Idalynn Besser – viola
Jenny Bifano – violin
Charlie Bisharat – violin
Laura Brenes – French horn
Jimmy Bowland – saxophone
Jaco Caraco – guitar
Paul Cartwright – violin
Bruce Christiansen – viola
Leroy Clampitt – bass
Stuart Clark – clarinet
Ryan Cockman – violin
Maria Conti – violin
Mike Cordone – trumpet
Phil Cornish – Hammond B3 organ
Wade Culbreath – timpani
Janet Darnall – violin
Charles Dixon – viola
Andrew Duckles – viol
Timothy Eckert – bass
Conni Ellisor – violin
Alicia Enstrom – violin
Lester Estelle – drums
Aben Eubanks – bass, guitar, keyboards, percussion
Leslie Fagan – flute
Katelyn Faraudo – French horn
Nicholas Gold – cello
Ali Gooding – violin

Erik Gratton – flute
Gerald Greer – violin
Jim Grosjean – viola 
Jason Halbert – Hammond B3 organ, keyboards, piano, programming
Erin Hall – violin
Dylan Hart – French horn
Neel Hammond – violin
Keyon Harrold – trumpet
Amy Helman – violin
Mark Hill – bass
Luanne Homzy – violin
Jack Jezserio – bass
Tommy King – organ, piano
Pete Korpela – percussion
Jennifer Kummer – French horn
Marisa Kunney – violin
Anthony LaMarchina – cello
Jules Levy – bass
Keith Loftis – tenor saxophone
Tim Loo – cello 
Lucia Micarelli – violin
Camille Miller – violin
Jeffrey Miller – trombone
Jesse McGinty – saxophone
Ray Montiero – trumpet
Craig Nelson– bass
Jenni Olsen – flute
Alyssa Park – violin
Anthony Parnther – bassoon
Greg Phillinganes – piano

Peter Povey – violin
Linnea Powell – viola
Aaron Redfield – drums, percussion
Sari Reist – cello
Danny Rivera – baritone saxophone
Katty Rodriguez – baritone saxophone
Rob Schaer – trumpet 
Erick Serna – guitar, ukulele
Jesse Shatkin – drum programming, percussion, synthesizers
Jung-Min Shin – violin
Garrett Smith – trombone 
Vanessa Freebairn Smith – cello
Ron Sorbo – timpani, percussion
Anna Spina – French horn
Marcus Strickland – tenor saxophone
Luke Sullivant – guitar
Amy Tatum – flute 
Charlie Tyler – cello
Alan Umstead – violin
Catherine Umstead – violin
Mary Kathryn VanOsdale – violin
Ina Veli – violin
Diana Wade – violin
Corey Wallace – trombone 
Bruce Wethey – violin
Kyle Whalum – bass, upright bass
Lara Wickes – oboe
Karen Winklemann – violin
Shu-Zheng – viola

Production

BTW Productions – music preparation
Drew Atz – brass recording
Greg Gigendad Burke – art direction and design
Nick Cazares – music librarian
John Chapman – orchestra recording
Nathan Cimino – engineer
Anthony Circo – scoring coordinator
Kelly Clarkson – executive producer
Jessi Collins – vocal arrangements
Mike Cordone – brass arrangement
Danja – co-producer 
Spencer Dennis – assistant
John DeNosky – additional engineer, additional programming
Sam Dent – engineer
Jeff Fitzpatrick – pro tools operator
Gloria Elias-Foeillet – makeup

Chris Gehringer – mastering
Serban Ghenea – mixing
Jason Halbert – arrangement, producer
Jennifer Hammond – additional orchestrations
John Hanes – engineer
Tom Hardisty – Eastwood Stage crew
Keyon Harrold – brass arrangement
Luanne Hornzy – concertmaster
Jason Lazarus – additional arrangement
Mark Lubetski – backline technician
Craig Kallman – executive producer
Whitney Martin – orchestra contractor
Candace Lambert McAndrews – styling
Jamie Olvera – Eastwood Stage crew
Rachel Orscher – additional programming
Tom Peltier – 2nd engineer

Greg Phillinganes – arrangement
Robert Ramos – hair
Clark Rhea – additional arrangement
Jesse Shatkin – engineer, producer
Carter Smith – photography
Nick Spezia – orchestra recording engineer
Andy Taub – engineer
Joseph Trapanese – orchestra arrangement, conductor, production
Robert Venable – engineer
Alan Umstead – orchestra contractor
Sam Wahl – engineer
Richard Wheeler, Jr. – Eastwood Stage crew
Booker White – music preparation
Shane Wilson – engineer
Derek Zeoli – technical coordinato
Ginna Zimmitti – orchestra contractor

Charts

Release history

References

External links
 

2021 Christmas albums
Albums produced by Jesse Shatkin
Atlantic Records albums
Christmas albums by American artists
Kelly Clarkson albums
Pop Christmas albums